The 2000–01 Eastern European Hockey League season, was the sixth season of the multi-national ice hockey league. Nine teams participated in the league, and HC Berkut Kiev of Ukraine won the championship.

Regular season

Playoffs

External links
Season on hockeyarchives.info

2
Eastern European Hockey League seasons